The 2021–22 Albany Great Danes men's basketball team  represented the University at Albany, SUNY in the 2021–22 NCAA Division I men's basketball season. They played their home games at the SEFCU Arena in Albany, New York and were led by first-year head coach Dwayne Killings. They finished 13-18, 9-9 in America East Play to finish a tie for 5th place. They lost in the quarterfinals of the America East tournament to Hartford.

Previous season
In a season limited due to the ongoing COVID-19 pandemic, the Great Danes finished the 2020–21 season 7–9, 6–6 in America East play to finish in fifth place. They defeated NJIT in the first round of the America East tournament, before losing to Hartford in the quarterfinals.

On March 1, 2021, head coach Will Brown announced in a press release that he and the school agreed to part ways, ending Brown's 20-year tenure with the team. On March 17, the school announced that they had hired Marquette associate head coach Dwayne Killings to be the Great Danes' next head coach.

Roster

Schedule and results

|-
!colspan=12 style=| Non-conference regular season

|-
!colspan=12 style=| America East Conference regular season

|-
!colspan=12 style=| America East tournament

Source

References

Albany Great Danes men's basketball seasons
Albany Great Danes
2021 in sports in New York (state)
2022 in sports in New York (state)